Anwar Habib al-Fatayri (February 1946 - 9 February 1989) was an assassinated Lebanese politician and junior commander of the People's Liberation Army.

Biography

Early life and education 
Anwar bin Hassib Al-Fatayri was born in Jdeideh of the Chouf district in Lebanon in the year 1946. He received his primary education at Al-Mukhtara School and secondary education at the School of the Missionary Fathers in Jounieh. He then joined the Faculty of Education at the Lebanese University and obtained a BA in Mathematics and then at the Arab University, where he obtained a BA in History.

Career 
In the Progressive Socialist Party, he assumed several offices. He was the Secretary of the PSP's youth wing and the Mobilization Commissioner in 1976, the Secretary of the Publicity and Publication Commission in 1978, a member of the Leadership Council and received the General Secretariat in 1984. In 1985, he was a member of the Political Bureau and a member of the Committee Central until the date of his assassination.

Assassination 
On February 9, 1989, Fatayri was in Wadi Benhaliah, the Chouf region, preparing for a military implementation by Walid Jumblatt. A general that was alongside Fatayri shot him for reasons that are still unknown. A full national funeral was held for him in Dar Al-Mukhtara, in which a number of dignitaries and national leaders spoke, including Walid Jumblatt.

On April 14, 2018, Taymour Jumblatt, son of Walid, unveiled the statue of Anwar al-Fatayri, in a celebration that was held in the town of Jdeideh in the Chouf district, in the presence of Progressive Socialist Party leaders, municipal governors and civil and Druze sheikhs.

See also
Lebanese Civil War
Mountain War (Lebanon)
People's Liberation Army (Lebanon)

References

Bibliography
 Makram Rabah, Conflict on Mount Lebanon: The Druze, the Maronites and Collective Memory, Alternative Histories, Edinburgh University Press, 2020 (1st edition).

External links 
Popular song in honor of Anwar al-Fatayri

Lebanese Druze
Progressive Socialist Party politicians
People from Chouf District
1946 births
1989 deaths
Lebanese University alumni
Academic staff of Lebanese University
Academic staff of Beirut Arab University
Beirut Arab University alumni
Assassinated Lebanese politicians
People of the Lebanese Civil War